Ludovico Ridolfi (1587–1649) was a Roman Catholic prelate who served as Bishop of Patti (1649).

Biography
Ludovico Ridolfi was born on 5 Sep 1587 in Rome, Italy.
On 3 Mar 1649, he was selected as Bishop of Patti and confirmed by Pope Innocent X on 19 Jul 1649.
On 12 Sep 1649, he was consecrated bishop by Alfonso de la Cueva-Benavides y Mendoza-Carrillo, Cardinal-Bishop of Palestrina, with Luca Torreggiani, Archbishop of Ravenna, and Francesco Tontori, Bishop of Ischia, serving as co-consecrators. 
He served as Bishop of Patti until his death on 28 Oct 1649.

References

External links and additional sources
 (for Chronology of Bishops) 
 (for Chronology of Bishops) 

17th-century Roman Catholic bishops in Sicily
Bishops appointed by Pope Innocent X
1587 births
1649 deaths